Matthew Nicholas Partridge (born 7 November 1993) is an English football defender who plays for National League South side Hungerford Town.

Career 
Partridge started his career in the youth system at Reading progressing through the academy as under-18's captain, he went on to sign a professional one-year contract in July 2012. In October 2012, he joined Isthmian League Premier Division side Bognor Regis Town on a one-month loan deal. In November his loan was extended for a further month. Having returned to Reading after the Boxing Day fixture, he remained a regular for the under-21s during the 2012–13 campaign. In May 2013, he was offered a new one-year contract by Reading.

In September 2013, he joined Conference South side Basingstoke Town on a one-month loan deal. He scored on his debut in a 3–2 away defeat to Bromley, scoring the opening goal. His second goal for the club came in a 3–1 defeat to Weston-super-Mare in the FA Cup. In October, his loan at the club was extended for a further month. In November, he scored the second in a 2–0 victory over Dover Athletic in the league. At the end of the month his loan expired having made eight appearances scoring three times. At the end of December he re-joined Basingstoke on loan until the end of the season. His final goal for the club came in February 2014, in a 1–1 draw with Boreham Wood. He finished the season having made fifteen appearances scoring four goals in all competitions.

In July 2014, having been released by Reading he signed for Football League Two side Dagenham & Redbridge on a one-year deal. He made his professional debut in August 2014, starting in the Football League Cup tie against Brentford. The match ended in a 6–6 draw, equaling the record for the most goals scored in a League Cup game, with Brentford eventually advancing on penalties.

In August 2015, after starting his second season with the club as a regular and just two months after signing a new deal, Partridge was released by Dagenham by mutual consent. Four days later he re-joined National League South side Basingstoke Town only to sign for League Two club Newport County shortly after. He made his debut for Newport on 5 September 2015. He was released by Newport on 10 May 2016 at the end of his contract. In the summer of 2017, he returned to Basingstoke Town for a third spell, making a total of thirty-eight appearances and scoring six goals upon his return. In July 2017, he signed for National League South side Hungerford Town on a free transfer.

On 22 May 2019, Partridge joined Gosport Borough.

Personal life 
He was raised in Thatcham, Berkshire and attended the Kennet School in the town. In April 2014, he was given a twelve-month prison sentence, suspended for two years, after being found guilty of assaulting a motorcyclist in Woolhampton in August 2013.

Career statistics

References

External links 
Matt Partridge profile at Dagenham & Redbridge F.C.

1993 births
Living people
English footballers
Association football central defenders
Reading F.C. players
Bognor Regis Town F.C. players
Basingstoke Town F.C. players
Dagenham & Redbridge F.C. players
Newport County A.F.C. players
Hungerford Town F.C. players
Salisbury City F.C. players
Gosport Borough F.C. players
Thatcham Town F.C. players
English Football League players
National League (English football) players
Isthmian League players
Southern Football League players